Gastroclonium is a genus of red algae (Rhodophyta) in the family Champiaceae. , according to AlgaeBase, it comprises the following species:

 Gastroclonium clavatum (Roth) Ardissone
 Gastroclonium compressum (Hollenberg) C.F.Chang & B.M.Xia
 Gastroclonium cylindricum Santelices, I.A.Abbott & Ramírez
 Gastroclonium iyengarii K.Srinivasan
 Gastroclonium ovatum (Hudson) Papenfuss
 Gastroclonium pacificum (E.Y.Dawson) C.F.Chang & B.M.Xia
 Gastroclonium parvum (Hollenberg) C.F.Chang & B.M.Xia
 Gastroclonium pygmaeum Funk
 Gastroclonium reflexum (Chauvin) Kützing
 Gastroclonium trichodes (C.Pujals) B.Santelices, I.A.Abbott & M.E.Ramírez
 Gastroclonium xishaense C.F.Chang & B.M.Xia

References

Red algae genera
Rhodymeniales